Gert Heidler (born 30 January 1948) is a former German footballer and football manager.

Club career 
The forward played for Dynamo Dresden from 1968 until 1982, making 281 appearances for the first team.

International career 
He won the gold medal at the 1976 Summer Olympics with the East German Olympic Team. Heidler won caps for the full GDR team between 1976 and 1978.

Coaching career 
He later worked as a coach. One of his stints was with the youth ranks of Dynamo Dresden.

References

External links
 
 
 

1948 births
Living people
German footballers
East German footballers
Footballers at the 1976 Summer Olympics
Olympic footballers of East Germany
Olympic gold medalists for East Germany
Dynamo Dresden players
East Germany international footballers
Olympic medalists in football
DDR-Oberliga players
Medalists at the 1976 Summer Olympics
Association football forwards